Ntyuka, is a administrative ward in Dodoma Urban in the Dodoma Region of Tanzania.

In 2016 reports there were 4,954 people in the ward, from 4,558 in 2012. The ward has .

References

Dodoma
Wards of Dodoma Region